Conchita Martínez was the defending champion but lost in the semifinals to Barbara Paulus.

Arantxa Sánchez Vicario won in the final 6–2, 2–6, 6–2 against Paulus.

Seeds
A champion seed is indicated in bold text while text in italics indicates the round in which that seed was eliminated. The top four seeds received a bye to the second round.

  Conchita Martínez (semifinals)
  Arantxa Sánchez Vicario (champion)
  Iva Majoli (quarterfinals)
  Gabriela Sabatini (second round)
  Magdalena Maleeva (second round)
  Jana Novotná (semifinals)
  Mary Joe Fernández (second round)
  Mary Pierce (second round)

Draw

Final

Section 1

Section 2

External links
 1996 Family Circle Cup Draw

Charleston Open
1996 WTA Tour